The women's épée was one of ten fencing events on the fencing at the 2000 Summer Olympics programme. It was the second appearance of the event. The competition was held on 17 September 2000. 39 fencers from 22 nations competed.

Main tournament bracket 
The field of 39 fencers from 22 nations competed in a single-elimination tournament to determine the medal winners.  Semifinal losers proceeded to a bronze medal match.

Bronze medal final

Results

References

External links 
 Report of the 2000 Sydney Summer Olympics

Epee team
2000 in women's fencing
Women's events at the 2000 Summer Olympics